The Fisher House is a historic house in Kalispell, Montana, U.S.. It was built in 1892 for Reverend George McVey Fisher, a Presbyterian minister, his wife Mary Swaney, and their six children. It was designed in the Stick/Eastlake architectural style. From 1941 to the 1980s, it was owned by their daughter Mary and her husband James Heller. It has been listed on the National Register of Historic Places since August 25, 1994.

References

Houses on the National Register of Historic Places in Montana
Stick-Eastlake architecture in Montana
Houses completed in 1892
National Register of Historic Places in Flathead County, Montana
1892 establishments in Montana
Houses in Flathead County, Montana
Kalispell, Montana